Real to Real Cacophony (sometimes incorrectly referred as Reel to Real Cacophony) is the second studio album by Scottish rock band Simple Minds. It was released on 23 November 1979 through record labels Zoom and Arista.

Recording 
Real to Real Cacophony was recorded and mixed in five weeks at Rockfield Studios. According to producer John Leckie the band had only four songs ("Premonition", "Factory", "Calling Your Name" and "Changeling"), the rest of the album was written in the studio.

Release 
Real to Real Cacophony was less successful than Life in a Day, it did not chart, nor did its only single, "Changeling".

The 2002/2003 reissues by Virgin Records incorrectly render the album's title as Reel to Real Cacophony, and the opening track as "Reel to Real". The new spelling also appears in the discography section of all the inlays in the 2002/2003 Simple Minds remastered edition series. Subsequent editions render the title of both the album and track correctly.

Critical reception 

Real to Real Cacophony has been generally well received by critics. In Sounds, John Gill wrote: "Real to Real Cacophony shows a considerable – and brave – progression. It captures some of the shock-effects of the avant-garde, some of the emotional power of outfits like the Pop Group, yet still retains the best of the Minds tight and trebly riffing. File under impressive." Eric Chappe of CMJ New Music Monthly highlighted Simple Minds' "determination to constantly add unexpected touches to the arrangements".

Retrospectively, Andy Kellman of AllMusic praised Real to Real Cacophony, saying that it marked the point "where Simple Minds ventured beyond the ability to mimic their influences and began to manipulate them, mercilessly pushing them around and shaping them into funny objects the way a child transforms a chunk of Play-Doh from an indefinable chunk of nothing into a definable chunk of something", and calling it "an achievement that's on a plane with other 1979 post-punk landmarks like Metal Box, 154, Entertainment! and Unknown Pleasures". Bob Stanley wrote in Record Collector that the album "should be hailed as a singularly strong post-punk-into-synth-pop bridge but the shadow of 'Belfast Child' looms over their legacy." Trouser Press was more lukewarm, remarking that the album "lives up (or down) to the clever title".

Track listing

Personnel 
Adapted from the album's liner notes.

Simple Minds
 Jim Kerr – vocals, arrangements
 Charles Burchill – guitar, violin, saxophone, arrangements
 Derek Forbes – bass guitar, arrangements
 Brian McGee – drums, percussion, arrangements
 Michael MacNeil – keyboards, arrangements

Technical
 John Leckie – producer, engineer, mixing, arrangements
 Mariella Sometimes – tape operator
 Paul Henry – sleeve, packaging
 Graphyk – sleeve graphics
 Sheila Rock – sleeve photography
 Trevor Rodgers – sleeve photography

References

External links 
 

1979 albums
Simple Minds albums
Albums produced by John Leckie
Arista Records albums
Albums recorded at Rockfield Studios